Reply is an Italian company that specialises in consulting, system integration and digital services, with a focus on the design and implementation of solutions based on the web and social networks.

Reply's revenue increased from €33.3 million in 2000, the year the company was listed on the STAR segment of the Italian Stock Exchange (Borsa Italiana), to €1.48 billion and over 10,500 employees in 2021.

History 
Founded in 1996 in Turin by a group of IT managers led by Mario Rizzante the company uses a network model, consisting of dozens of companies (controlled by a parent company and each focused on a specific business) operating in various sectors such as big data, cloud computing, digital media and internet of things.

Since 2006, the year in which the leadership of the company passes to Tatiana Rizzante, daughter of Mario, the expansion in Europe, in particular in England and Germany, begins, both opening new offices and making existing realities. So it's the turn of the Benelux and France. In the family business, Tatiana's brother Filippo also works as chief technology officer. In 2013 Mario Rizzante was nominated Cavaliere del Lavoro.

Turnover increased from 33.3 million euros in 2000, the year of listing on the Star segment of Borsa Italiana, to 884 million euros in 2017.

Already in 2004, according to Forbes, it was among the top 25 Italian companies with the highest growth rate.

Sectors 
Thanks to the companies of its network, Reply operates in the following sectors:
 Energy and Utilities
 Telecom, Media & Entertainment
 Industrial Products
 Distribution & Transportation
 Banking
 Insurance
 Public Sector
 Healthcare
 Cybersecurity

Corporate structure 
Tatiana Rizzante and her brother Filippo own a 12.91% stake each in Alika, the holding company that owns 53.5% of Reply.  In October 2017, the controlling stake in the holding was dropped to 45.1%.

External links 

 Reply group official website

References 

Information technology companies of Italy
Macroeconomics consulting firms
Companies based in Turin
Italian companies established in 1996
Consulting firms established in 1996
International information technology consulting firms
International management consulting firms
Management consulting firms of Italy
Companies listed on the Borsa Italiana